Ribjek is a small settlement in the Municipality of Mokronog-Trebelno in southeastern Slovenia. It lies just west of Mokronog, south of Beli Grič. The area is part of the historical region of Lower Carniola. The municipality is now included in the Southeast Slovenia Statistical Region.

References

External links
Ribjek on Geopedia

Populated places in the Municipality of Mokronog-Trebelno